Hypentelium is a genus of suckers found in eastern United States and Canada.  There are three recognized species of them.

Species
 Hypentelium etowanum (D. S. Jordan, 1877) (Alabama hog sucker)
 Hypentelium nigricans (Lesueur, 1817) (Northern hog sucker)
 Hypentelium roanokense Raney & Lachner, 1947 (Roanoke hog sucker)

References
 

Catostomidae
Fish of North America
Taxa named by Constantine Samuel Rafinesque